Ashok Kumar Singh Chandel (born 4 July 1954) is an Indian politician and a former member of Uttar Pradesh Legislative Assembly representing Hamirpur assembly constituency four times. He was also elected to Thirteenth Lok Sabha from Hamirpur parliamentary constituency as BSP candidate.

He was proven guilty in a case involving death of five citizens in 1997. The High court issued an order on April 19, 2019 where the politician was convicted of cold blooded homicide and was given life imprisonment along with eleven other conspirers.

On 19 April 2019, Allahabad High court sentenced him to life imprisonment for murdering five people in which one was eight years old child.

References

External links
 Biography

1954 births
Living people
India MPs 1999–2004
Lok Sabha members from Uttar Pradesh
Uttar Pradesh MLAs 2017–2022
People from Hamirpur, Uttar Pradesh
Janata Dal politicians
Samajwadi Party politicians
Bahujan Samaj Party politicians
Bharatiya Janata Party politicians from Uttar Pradesh
Samajwadi Party politicians from Uttar Pradesh